The Bogdana is a left tributary of the river Simila in Romania. It flows into the Simila in Băcani.

References

Rivers of Romania
Rivers of Vaslui County